Maly Utyash (Bäläkäy Ütäş) is a rural locality (a village) in Zilim-Karanovsky Selsoviet, Gafuriysky District, Bashkortostan, Russia. The population was 122 as of 2010. There are 4 streets.

Geography 
Maly Utyash is located 46 km north of Krasnousolsky (the district's administrative centre) by road. Sredny Utyash is the nearest rural locality.

References 

Rural localities in Gafuriysky District